Angelo's is a British sitcom that aired on Five in 2007. One series of six episodes was produced. It was written by Sharon Horgan who was also a member of ensemble cast. Steve Brody starred in the titular role as the proprietor of London cafe Angelo's. Also starring was Shelley Longworth as Maria, Angelo's daughter, Alice Lowe, Miranda Hart and Javone Prince. Paul Kaye and Belinda Stewart-Wilson guest starred.  Horgan claimed that before the show aired, they discovered that Five had decided not to fund any more original comedy, effectively cancelling the show.

References

External links

Angelo's at the British Comedy Guide

2007 British television series debuts
2007 British television series endings
2000s British sitcoms
Channel 5 (British TV channel) sitcoms
2000s British television miniseries
English-language television shows
Television shows set in London
Television series created by Sharon Horgan
Television series by Banijay